The Rivière de la Place is a tributary of the east bank of the Métabetchouane River, flowing in the Laurentides Wildlife Reserve, in the administrative region of the Capitale-Nationale, in the province of Quebec, in Canada. The river flows through the regional county municipalities (MRC) of:
 La Côte-de-Beaupré Regional County Municipality: the unorganized territory of Lac-Jacques-Cartier;
 La Jacques-Cartier Regional County Municipality: the unorganized territory of Lac-Croche.

Forestry is the main economic activity in this valley; recreational tourism, second.

The "rivière de la Place" surface (except rapids) is usually frozen from late November to early April, however safe circulation on the ice is generally from mid-December to late March.

Geography 
The main watersheds neighboring the "rivière de la Place" are:
 north side: Métabetchouane East River, Liane stream, Sansoucy lake;
 east side: F.-X.-Lemieux Lake, rivière Jacques-Cartier Nord-Ouest;
 south side: Métabetchouane River, Lac Croche;
 west side: Métabetchouane River, Passes stream.

The "rivière de la Place rises at the mouth of Lac des Buttes. Enclosed between mountains, this lake has a single small stream feeding it.

Upper course of the Place river (from its source) (segment of )

  southwards crossing  on Lake Lafavry, then on  Lac du Terrier, to its mouth;
  south to the outlet (coming from the east) of Talweg lake;
  towards the south by forming a hook towards the west by cutting for a hundred meters the southern part of the Lac des Fourrés, up to its mouth;
  to the south by forming a hook towards the east at the end of the segment, to the east shore of Lake Neuville;
  westward across Lake Neuville over a full-length, to its mouth;

Lower course of the Place River (segment of )

  to the west, branching south to a stream (coming from the south);
  westwards crossing three series of rapids at the start of the segment, up to a bend in the river;
  to the west, forming a large curve to the south to go around a mountain, up to a bend in the river;
  towards the southwest by crossing a series of rapids, until its confluence with the Métabetchouane River (coming from the southeast).

Toponymy 
The expression "de la Place" refers to the family name "De La Place" of French origin.

The toponym "Place River" was formalized on December 5, 1968, at the Place Names Bank of the Commission de toponymie du Québec.

See also 

 St. Lawrence River
 List of rivers of Quebec

References

External links
 Official site of the Réserve faunique des Laurentides

Rivers of Capitale-Nationale
La Côte-de-Beaupré Regional County Municipality
La Jacques-Cartier Regional County Municipality
Laurentides Wildlife Reserve